Anthony David Francis Henry Fane, 16th Earl of Westmorland  (born 1951), styled Lord Burghersh until 1993 (and nicknamed Burghie), is a British peer and outdoorsman.

He was a member of the House of Lords from 1993 to 1999.

Early life
The eldest son of David Fane, 15th Earl of Westmorland and his wife Barbara Jane, he was educated at Eton College and then in Spain.

Career
He was a director of Phillips the Auctioneers from 1994 until 2002 and then of Bonhams until 2003. In that year he joined Piers Watson to found Watson Westmorland, an independent art appraisal firm.

Westmorland is a Fellow of the Royal Geographical Society, life president of the St Moritz Sporting Club, and was a member of the Orbitex North Pole research expedition in 1990.

Personal life
In 1985, he married Caroline Fairey, by whom he has one daughter, Lady Daisy Caroline Fane (born 18 January 1989).

The heir presumptive to the earldom is his brother Harry St. Clair Fane (born 1953), whose heir is his son Sam Michael David Fane (born 1989).

References

External links
Profile at Watson Westmorland
Anthony Fane, 16th Earl of Westmorland

1951 births
Living people
20th-century English nobility
21st-century English nobility
People educated at Eton College
Fellows of the Royal Geographical Society
Earls of Westmorland
Barons Burghersh
David
Westmorland